This is a list of cities, towns and villages of Hungary

KEY: T Nagi Beckchervick = Town ; V = Village

 A, Á
 B
 C
 Cs
 D
 E, É
 F
 G
 Gy
 H
 I, Í
 J
 K
 L
 M
 N
 Ny
 O, Ó
 Ö, O
 P
 R
 S
 Sz
 T
 U, Ú
 Ü, U
 V
 Z
 Zs

Notes
 Cities marked with * have several different post codes, the one here is only the most general one.

 
Cities, towns and villages